The Bessemer City mine is one of the largest lithium mines in the United States. The mine is located in eastern United States in North Carolina. The Bessemer City mine has reserves amounting to 62.3 million tonnes of lithium ore grading 0.67% lithium thus resulting 0.42 million tonnes of lithium.

References 

Lithium mines in the United States
Companies based in North Carolina